Gaffar Express is a passenger train operated daily by Pakistan Railways between Quetta and Peshawar.

History
The Jaffar Express is named after Mir Jaffar Khan Jamali, who was a prominent Baloch tribal leader, active member of the Pakistan Movement, and a close friend of the Mohammad Ali Jinnah. He was the uncle of former Prime Minister Mir Zafarullah Khan Jamali. The train was inaugurated by the Prime Minister Mir Zafarullah Khan Jamali on 16 April 2003 with Chinese rakes. The original Jaffar Express ran between Quetta and Rawalpindi. In April 2017, the train was extended to Peshawar.

Route
 Quetta–Rohri Junction via Rohri–Chaman Railway Line
 Rohri Junction–Peshawar Cantonment via Karachi–Peshawar Railway Line

Station stops

Equipments

References

Named passenger trains of Pakistan
Passenger trains in Pakistan
Railway services introduced in 2003
Rail transport in Balochistan, Pakistan